St. Peter's College is a 12–19 mixed secondary school in Dunboyne, County Meath, Ireland.

History 
The process of providing a school for Dunboyne began in earnest in September 1992 when the Parent Teacher Association of Dunboyne National School called a public meeting to ascertain the need for post primary education in the area. The early months were not without controversy, particularly in relation to the proposed management structures and trustees of the school. However the subsequent agreement reached between Co. Meath Vocational Education Committee (VEC) and the Bishop of Meath resulted in the school being built. Since then, the VEC has been abolished and was replaced by Louth and Meath Education and Training Board.  St. Peter's College opened in September 1996 with an enrolment of 75 first-year students. Today, the student population stands at ~1150.

A new extension was completed in September 2009 and a 16-room extension opened in 2018.

Curriculum 
Students take a number of compulsory subjects, some of which are non-examination. Junior certificate students must also choose two optional subjects and must do a foreign language of their choice. Leaving certificate students must choose four optional subjects and do not have to do a foreign language although it is heavily recommended by the school.

Notable alumni 
 Darren Sutherland, former middleweight boxer, Olympic bronze medallist
 Niall Quinn, racing driver
 Sinéad Noonan, Miss Ireland 2008

References

External links 
 

Secondary schools in County Meath
Educational institutions established in 1994
1994 establishments in Ireland